Rachoviscus is a small genus of characins from Brazil. These threatened fish are endemic to coastal river basins in Bahia, Paraná and Santa Catarina.

There are two currently recognized species:
Rachoviscus crassiceps G. S. Myers, 1926
Rachoviscus graciliceps S. H. Weitzman & da Cruz, 1981

References

Characidae
Fish of South America
Fish of Brazil
Endemic fauna of Brazil